Chasidica (Hebrew: חסידיקא) is an Israeli Jewish hard rock band formed in 2007 by brothers Sagi and Idan Givol.

Biography
Chasidica was formed in 2007 by brothers Sagi and Idan Givol. Sagi lived in Australia for eight years and fronted the heavy metal band Demona before becoming a baal teshuva to Hasidic Judaism in 2002.

In 2009, they began a series of concerts called Yehudi Alternativi ("Jewish Alternative") to help promote similarly-minded Jewish artists. One of the first of these concerts was at Jerusalem's Canaan club with Chasidica, klezmer-fusion band Ramzailech, and Hasidic blues rock band Yood.

The band is currently working on a debut album with Shai Lahav of Dr. Kasper's Bunny Show.

Musical style
The Givol brothers grew up listening to heavy metal and experimental music. They have claimed among their influences both Hasidic music and the band Fortisakharof. Ynet reviewer Vicky Epstein noted elements from the Pixies and likened their vocals to that of Faith No More's Mike Patton. In addition, their sound utilizes klezmer instruments like violins, clarinets, and occasional Middle Eastern instruments like the darbouka.

Members

Current members
Sagi Givol – guitars, lead vocals
Idan Givol – bass, backing vocals
Moshe Somech – drums
Tomer Einat – violin

Former members
Dror Cohen – drums
Michael Gabizon – keyboards

References

External links

Jewish rock groups
Jewish heavy metal musicians
Musical groups established in 2007
Musical groups from Jerusalem
Baalei teshuva
Israeli alternative rock groups
Hasidic music
2007 establishments in Israel
Israeli heavy metal musical groups